The 2002 Cork Senior Hurling Championship was the 114th staging of the Cork Senior Hurling Championship since its establishment by the Cork County Board in 1887. The draw for the 2002 opening round fixtures took place on 9 December 2001. The championship ended on 15 September 2002.

Blackrock were the defending champions.

On 15 September 2002, Blackrock won the championship following a 1-14 to 0-12 defeat of Newtownshandrum in the final. This was their 32nd championship title overall and their second in successive championship seasons.

Team changes

To Championship

Promoted from the Cork Intermediate Hurling Championship
 Killeagh

Results

Preliminary round

Round 1

Round 2

Round 3

Quarter-finals

Semi-finals

Final

Championship statistics

Top scorers

Overall

In a single game

References

Cork Senior Hurling Championship
Cork Senior Hurling Championship